Sara Howard or Sarah Howard may refer to:

Sara Howard (politician) (born 1981), senator in the Nebraska Legislature
Sara Howard (speech therapist), British professor of clinical phonetics
Sarah Howard, Countess of Suffolk (died 1776), formerly Sarah Inwen

See also 
 Howard (surname)